Henry Robert Brett was Dean of Belfast in the second quarter of the 20th century. Ordained in 1893, his first posts were curacies at Coleraine and Belfast after which he was Vicar of St Peter's Belfast and then Archdeacon of Connor before his appointment as Dean of Belfast.

Arms

Notes

1868 births
People educated at Kilkenny College
Alumni of Trinity College Dublin
Irish Anglicans
Archdeacons of Connor
Deans of Belfast
1932 deaths